Đồng Lạc may refer to several commune-level subdivisions in Vietnam, including:

Đồng Lạc, Chí Linh, a ward of Chí Linh in Hải Dương Province
Đồng Lạc, Hanoi, a commune of Chương Mỹ District
Đồng Lạc, Bắc Kạn, a commune of Chợ Đồn District
Đồng Lạc, Nam Sách, a commune of Nam Sách District in Hải Dương Province
Đồng Lạc, Phú Thọ, a commune of Yên Lập District
Đồng Lạc, Bắc Giang, a commune of Yên Thế District